John Wayne Elementary School (P.S. 380), is an elementary school, located at 370 Marcy Avenue, Williamsburg, Brooklyn.

Dedicated in honor of John Wayne on October 28, 1982, "John Wayne Elementary School Day".
John Wayne's seven children attended the dedication.
Inside the school is a 38-foot mosaic mural commission by New York artist Knox Martin entitled "John Wayne and the American Frontier".

John Wayne Elementary School was in the news in 2007 when it was reported that "Subway Hero" Wesley Autrey was working at the school.

See also 
 List of public elementary schools in New York City
John Wayne
Knox Martin

References

Books 
 Michele Cohen, Stan Ries, and Michael Bloomberg "Public Art for Public Schools" (New York: The Monacelli Press, 2009)

External links
 PS 380 John Wayne Elementary
 John Wayne Mural
 John Wayne Website
 Knox Martin Website
 PlaceMatters Website

Public elementary schools in Brooklyn
Williamsburg, Brooklyn
John Wayne